Genheim is a village and an Ortsteil (subdivision) of the municipality Waldalgesheim in the district Mainz-Bingen in Rhineland-Palatinate, Germany. The village is managed by the collective municipality of Rhein-Nahe, which has its administrative office in Bingen am Rhein.

Geography

Location 
Genheim is located on the southeast edge of the Hunsrück between Koblenz and Bad Kreuznach, south of the Bingen Forest (Binger Wald) and the west of the river Nahe, some 6 km west of Bingen.

Neighbouring villages 
Genheim's neighbours are Waldalgesheim, Waldlaubersheim, Roth and Schweppenhausen.

History 
The first documented mention in the Lorsch codex was in 767 A.D. Formerly an independent municipality, it is part of the municipality Waldalgesheim since 1970.

External links 
 www.waldalgesheim.de
 www.karl-may-stiftung.de, Waldröschen Bd.35

References 

Villages in Rhineland-Palatinate